Alawi bin Husain (died 1816) was the Sultan of and on Anjouan island (in the Comoros Islands) from 1796 to his death in 1816. 

He was succeeded by his son Abdallah bin Alawi.

References

18th-century births
1816 deaths
Year of birth missing
Sultans of Anjouan
19th-century monarchs in Africa